Jeon Young-dai (born 4 October 1960) is a South Korean former professional tennis player.

Born in Chungmu, Jeon didn't take up tennis until his second year of middle school and was first selected to South Korea's national team as a 17-year old. In the 1980 Davis Cup tournament he helped South Korea win ties against Pakistan, Indonesia and India. He won a silver medal in men's doubles at the 1982 Asian Games in New Delhi (with Song Dong-wook). After retiring he became a coach and had a successful reign in charge of Konkuk University, which dominated the national college championships. He also became South Korea's national coach.

See also
List of South Korea Davis Cup team representatives

References

External links
 
 
 

1960 births
Living people
South Korean male tennis players
Asian Games medalists in tennis
Asian Games silver medalists for South Korea
Tennis players at the 1982 Asian Games
Medalists at the 1982 Asian Games
Universiade bronze medalists for South Korea
Universiade medalists in tennis
Medalists at the 1981 Summer Universiade
Sportspeople from South Gyeongsang Province